The Vinca massacre was a massacre carried out near Fivizzano, Tuscany, by the German 16th SS Panzergrenadier Division from 24 to 27 August 1944 in which 162 Italian civilians were killed.

It was one of many war crimes the division was involved in while stationed in Italy during the war.

Massacre
In August 1944 the German LXXV Army Corps responsible for the protection of the western part of the Gothic Line experienced increased partisan activity in the Apuan Alps. On 18 August a German officer was killed by partisans. The 16th SS Panzergrenadier Division, commanded by Max Simon who was convicted after the war for his involvement in the Marzabotto massacre, was tasked with an anti-partisan operation to clear out the region of partisans. After meticulous planning, and with the help of the Italian Fascist collaborators Black Brigades, the SS-Panzer-Aufklärungs-Abteilung 16, under the command of Walter Reder, as well as other German SS and Wehrmacht support units, began the operation on 24 August.

The German burnt villages and destroyed churches in the vicinity of Fivizzano for the next three days from 24 to 27 August. The villages of Gragnola, Monzone Alto, Equi Terme, Corsano, Lorano, Tenerano, Gallogna, Campiglione, Viano, Vezzanello, Cecina, Terma, Posterla and Colla were attacked. The various German attacks converged at Vinca, where those civilians that could not escape, mostly women, children and elderly, were massacred while hiding in the woods and caves, using machine guns and grenades.

After an encounter with local partisans on the 26 August the German troops returned to Vinca the following day. Those civilians who had returned to the village were massacred and Vinca destroyed. All up, in the three days the 16th SS Panzergrenadier Division operated in the area 162 civilians had been killed by the division.

Aftermath
Together with the massacres of Bardine and Bergiola Foscalina, the massacre of Vinca was among the indictments in the British trial against General Max Simon (1899–1961) at Padua in May and June 1947. Simon was sentenced to life imprisonment but pardoned in 1954.

In 1951 Walter Reder (1915–1991) was sentenced to life imprisonment by a military court in Bologna for the massacres of Vinca and Marzabotto. In 1985 Reder received an amnesty and was released.

A number of German SS soldiers were tried in absentia in 2009 and found guilty but did not serve time.

Colonel Giulio Lodovici, leader of the Italian collaborationists, was arrested in 1948, brought to trial and released because of a lack of evidence. All told, 64 members of the Black Brigades were sentenced to life imprisonment or lengthy prison sentences for the Vinca massacre but, because of a general amnesty in 1946, all were released a short time after.

In popular culture
In 2018 the joint Italian-German documentary The name of the father directed by Daniele Ceccarini, Paola Settimini, Mario Molinari,() was produced. It tells the true story of the son of Josef Maier, Udo Surer, a German lawyer from Bavaria, who discovered in 2004 that his father was involved in the Vinca and San Terenzo Monti massacres.

References

Bibliography

External links
  Regione Toscana - The Vinca massacre

Tuscany
Murder in Italy
1944 crimes in Italy
Massacres in 1944
Massacres in the Italian Social Republic
Mass murder in 1944
World War II crimes
August 1944 events
War crimes of the Wehrmacht